The Indiscreet Jewels (or The Indiscreet Toys, or The Talking Jewels) is the first novel by Denis Diderot, published anonymously in 1748. It is an allegory that portrays Louis XV of France as Mangogul, Sultan  of Congo, who owns a magic ring that makes women's vaginas ("jewels") talk. The character of Mirzoza represents Louis XV's mistress Madame de Pompadour. Diderot portrayed Pompadour in a flattering light in The Indiscreet Jewels, most likely to ensure her support for his Encyclopedie.

Plot summary
Sultan Mangogul of Congo is bored with life at court and suspects his mistress Mirzoza of infidelity. A genie presents him with a magical ring that has unique properties. When the ring is rubbed and pointed at the vagina of any woman the vagina begins speaking about its amorous experiences, to the confusion and consternation of its owner. The Sultan uses the ring about thirty times, usually at a dinner or other social gathering, and on these occasions the Sultan is typically visible to the woman. However, since the ring has the additional property of making its owner invisible when required, a few of the sexual experiences are recounted through direct observation, as the Sultan makes himself invisible in the unsuspecting woman's boudoir.

Notes

English translations

From Their Lips to His Ear. Pocket Erotica Series #6 (New Urge Editions/Black Scat Books, 2020)

References

Links 

 Les bijoux indiscrets, tome premier (French) from Google Books
 Les Bijoux Indiscrets: or, The Indiscreet Toys, volume I (English) from Google Books

1748 novels
Novels by Denis Diderot
French erotic novels
1740s fantasy novels
Works published anonymously
Vagina and vulva in art
1740s debut novels
Allegory